João Oneres Marchiori (2 May 1933 – 27 June 2017) was a Brazilian Roman Catholic bishop.

Ordained to the priesthood in 1960, Marchiori served as bishop of the Roman Catholic Diocese of Caçador, Brazil from 1977 to 1983. He then served as coadjutor bishop of the Roman Catholic Diocese of Lages from 1983 to 1987 and diocesan bishop of the Lages Diocese from 1987 to 2009.

Notes

1933 births
2017 deaths
20th-century Roman Catholic bishops in Brazil
21st-century Roman Catholic bishops in Brazil
Roman Catholic bishops of Lages